Motorways in Serbia are called auto-put, a name which simply means car-road. Roads that are motorways are categorized as state roads of IA category and are marked with one-digit numbers. They are maintained and operated by the national road operator company JP "Putevi Srbije" ("Roads of Serbia").

Network map

List of motorways
As the Serbian word for motorway is "autoput", the "A1", "A2", "A3", "A4" and "A5" road designations are used since 2013.

A1 motorway 

A1 runs from the Horgoš border crossing with Hungary near Subotica, passing Novi Sad, Belgrade (A3 and A2 junction), Pojate near Kruševac (A5 junction), Niš (A4 junction), Leskovac and Vranje and eventually ends at the Preševo border crossing with North Macedonia. This motorway is part of European route E75.

A2 motorway 

A2 is a motorway under construction that will link Belgrade with Republika Srpska and Montenegro. The route passes Obrenovac, Čačak, Požega,Uzice and ends at Kotroman (at the border with Bosnia and Herzegovina i.e. Republica Srpska), i.e. Arilje, Ivanjica and ends at Boljare (at the border with Montenegro).

As of 2021, the Čačak - Požega section is in construction, with Požega - Boljare section in planning.

A3 motorway 

A3 is runs from Batrovci border crossing with Croatia, passing Sremska Mitrovica and Ruma and ends at Dobanovci interchange near Belgrade.

A4 motorway 

A4 is a motorway that connects the A1 motorway near Niš to Gradina border crossing with Bulgaria, part of European route E80.

A5 motorway 

A5 is a motorway under construction that will link A1 with A2. The route starts at Pojate interchange near Ćićevac, passes Kruševac and Kraljevo and ends at Preljina interchange near Čačak. Construction of this stretch started in December 2019.

Planned motorways

Network expansion

See also
Transport in Serbia
List of controlled-access highway systems
Evolution of motorway construction in European nations

References

External links

 Regulation of State Roads